Gregory J. Scarpa Jr. (born April 8, 1951) is an American mobster and former caporegime in the Colombo crime family and government informant. He is the son of notorious hitman and fellow caporegime in the family Gregory Scarpa. During the 1990s, Scarpa was sentenced to 40 years in prison for racketeering, but provided the government with false information about terrorist tactics and possible attacks orchestrated by Ramzi Yousef. Scarpa Jr. has since won compassionate release from prison as a result of his failing health and terminal illness.

Early life
Gregory J. Scarpa Jr. was born on April 8, 1951, in Brooklyn, New York, to Connie Forrest and Gregory Scarpa, a notorious caporegime and hitman for the Colombo crime family. He followed in his father's footsteps and pursued a criminal career in the Colombo organization.

Federal authorities believed Scarpa murdered his associates Robert DiLeonardi in 1981, Anthony Frezza in 1985 and Joseph DeDomenico in 1987, ordered the murder of limousine driver Alfred Longobardi in 1981 and plotted the murder and burial of suspected informant Sal Cardaci beneath a Bensonhurst store.

Scarpa succeeded his father as a capo in the Colombo family after his father contracted HIV/AIDS following a contaminated blood transfusion in 1986.

Prison and informant
Scarpa was initially arrested in 1988, charged with racketeering and narcotics offences and sentenced to 20 years in prison.

Ramzi Yousef
Scarpa was jailed in Metropolitan Correctional Center, New York with terrorist Ramzi Yousef while the latter was being tried for masterminding the 1993 World Trade Center bombing. Scarpa provided the government with information against Yousef.

Scarpa claimed Yousef had spoken to him about plans to bomb an airplane or kidnap an American attorney to declare Yousef's 1996 trial a mistrial. He also stated Yousef had implied assistance from a foreign government, presumably Qatar, since Yousef's maternal uncle Khalid Sheikh Mohammed was living there as the guest of a cabinet official at the time. On March 31, 1996, Scarpa claimed Yousef had sent a bomb through the DHL postal service and also named Abdul Hakim Murad as a co-conspirator in a plan to bomb an airplane several months later. Scarpa also stated Yousef had people from England scouting the Atlanta Olympic Games.

In 1999, prosecutors said that Scarpa's tips about Yousef were "a scam" which led nowhere. Judge Reena Raggi agreed, ruling that Scarpa had not provided substantial assistance but had actually colluded with Yousef to mislead the government and chose to amend his initial sentence by doubling the length of his imprisonment.

Terry Nichols
In 2005, Scarpa tipped off authorities about previously undiscovered explosives and ammunition buried in the crawl space of the home of  Terry Nichols, a fellow prisoner at ADX Florence who had previously been convicted for his role in the Oklahoma City bombing. The Federal Bureau of Investigation had previously searched the home multiple times and the new discovery "embarrassed the F.B.I." according to Judge Edward Korman of the United States District Court for the Eastern District of New York. In December 2015, Judge Korman issued an order reducing Scarpa's sentence to 30 years in prison due to his tip in the Oklahoma City bombing case. The reduction was reversed upon appeal to the United States Court of Appeals for the Second Circuit which reasoned that, although he had provided substantial assistance to the government, the government had the right not to reduce his sentence based on legitimate concerns related to his false statements in the Yousef case.

Release
In November 2020, Judge Korman granted Scarpa a compassionate release from prison. Scarpa had been suffering from cancer and treatment had left him with no salivary glands and a hole in his throat. He planned to live with a sister in Florida.

References

1951 births
Living people
Inmates of ADX Florence
Colombo crime family
Federal Bureau of Investigation informants
Criminals from Brooklyn
American gangsters of Italian descent